David Tredinnick may refer to:

 David Tredinnick (politician) (born 1950), British politician
 David Tredinnick (actor), Australian actor